Bobridge is a surname. Notable people with the surname include:

Jack Bobridge (born 1989), Australian cyclist
Rhys Bobridge (born 1981), Australian singer, dancer, and make-up artist